Mayangon Township (is located in the northern part of Yangon. The township comprises ten wards, and shares borders with Insein Township and Mingaladon Township in the north, North Dagon Township, North Okkalapa Township, South Okkalapa Township and Yankin Township in the east, the Hlaing river, Hlaing Township and Hlaingthaya Township in the west, and Kamayut Township and Bahan Township in the south. The township has 30 primary schools, seven middle schools and five high schools.

One of the upscale neighbourhoods such as Parami is included in Mayangon Township.

Landmarks
The following is a list of landmarks protected by the city in Mayangon township.

References

Townships of Yangon